Wayne Ramsey (born January 31, 1957) is a Canadian former professional ice hockey defenceman. He was drafted in the sixth round, 104th overall, by the Buffalo Sabres in the 1977 NHL Amateur Draft; he played two games in the National Hockey League with Buffalo in the 1977–78 season, going scoreless. He was also drafted by the World Hockey Association's Indianapolis Racers, but never played in that league.

Career statistics

Regular season and playoffs

External links
 

1957 births
Living people
Brandon Wheat Kings players
Buffalo Sabres draft picks
Buffalo Sabres players
Canadian ice hockey defencemen
Hershey Bears players
Ice hockey people from Manitoba
Indianapolis Racers draft picks
Brandon Travellers players
Milwaukee Admirals (IHL) players
Port Huron Flags (IHL) players
Rochester Americans players
Springfield Indians players
Toledo Goaldiggers players